The  superyacht Ahpo was launched by Lürssen at their yard near Rendsburg and delivered later that same year to Canadian-Jamaican billionaire Michael Lee-Chin. Ahpo was built as a replacement for the owners previous yacht, Quattroelle, which he sold in 2014.

Design 
Both exterior and interior designs are from Nuvolari Lenard. The hull is built out of steel while the superstructure is made out of aluminium with teak laid decks. The yacht is classed by Lloyd's Register and flagged in the Marshall Islands.

Amenities 
Zero speed stabilizers, gym, elevator, swimming pool, movie theatre, piano, swimming platform, air conditioning, BBQ, beach club, spa room, sauna, hammam, underwater lights, beauty salon. There is also a helicopter landing pad on the bow.

Tenders 

 Two  tenders
 One Carbon Craft CC130
 Two Solas Rescue Boat

Recreational toys 
Waverunners, jet-skis, seabobs, kayaks, scuba gear, water skis, windsurf gear, bike, sail boat.

Performance 
Power is delivered by twin 4,351hp MTU (20V 4000 M73L) diesel engines.

See also
 List of motor yachts by length
 List of yachts built by Lürssen

References

2021 ships
Motor yachts
Ships built in Germany